Anadasmus accurata is a moth of the family Depressariidae. It is found in French Guiana and Brazil (Amazonas).

The wingspan is 19–20 mm. The forewings are whitish lilac-grey with the costal edge white. The plical and second discal stigmata are dark fuscous and there is a faint very irregular grey postmedian line, as well as a cloudy grey line from four-fifths of the costa to the dorsum before the tornus, sinuate inwards beneath the costa, then moderately curved. There is a marginal row of dark fuscous dots around the apex and termen. The hindwings are whitish-grey, becoming whitish towards the base.

References

Moths described in 1916
Anadasmus
Moths of South America